Shaykh Ali Khan Zanganeh (died 1689), was an Iranian statesman of Kurdish origin, who served as the grand vizier of the Safavid king (shah) Suleiman I (r. 1666–1694) from 1669 to 1689. Due to his efforts in reforming the declining Iranian economy, he has been called the "Safavid Amir Kabir" in modern historiography.

Family 
A native of the Kermanshah Province, Shaykh Ali Khan was the son of Ali Beg Zanganeh, and belonged to the Zanganeh tribe, a Sunni Kurdish tribe, which was part of the Qizilbash. Shaykh Ali Khan had two brothers named Najaf Qoli Beg Zanganeh and Shahrokh Sultan Zanganeh and also had several sons, whom were: Hossein Ali Khan Zanganeh, Suleiman Khan Zanganeh, Ismail Beg Zanganeh, Abbas Beg Zanganeh, Abbas Qoli Beg Zanganeh, and the most prominent one being Shahqoli Khan Zanganeh, who would also later serve as grand vizier of the country.

Biography 
Shaykh Ali Khan's destiny is similar to that of many other Iranian grand viziers—from Hasanak under the Ghaznavids to Amir Kabir under the Qajars—and is owing, in an established sense, to the ambivalence of the grand vizier's position in the Iranian bureaucratic practice.

Shaykh Ali Khan served as the commander of the empire's musketeer corps (tofangchi-aghasi) from 1668 till June 1669.

References

Sources 
 
 
 
 
 
 
 
 
 

People from Kermanshah
Iranian Kurdish people
Grand viziers of the Safavid Empire
History of Kermanshah Province
Safavid governors
Zanganeh
1610s births
1689 deaths
Safavid generals
Tofangchi-aghasi
17th-century Iranian politicians
17th-century people of Safavid Iran